Juneteenth is an American federal holiday celebrating the emancipation of African-Americans and the abolition of slavery.

Juneteenth may also refer to:
 "Juneteenth" (Atlanta), a television episode
 "Juneteenth" (Black-ish), a television episode
 Juneteenth (novel), 1999, by Ralph Ellison

See also